Carlswald is a suburb of Johannesburg, South Africa. It is located in Region 2.

The area was originally part of a farm owned by Carl Eisenberger.  The suburb is currently designated for small agricultural holdings with approximately 150 plots of land, each approximately 2.2 hectares in size. Little of this land is currently used in farming, apart from one farm which has a resident herd of cattle. Horses may be kept by residents, as well as small livestock such as sheep, chickens and geese.

==

Johannesburg Region A